The Ambassador of Norway to the United Kingdom is Norway's foremost diplomatic representative in the United Kingdom, and in charge of the Norwegian diplomatic mission in the UK. Norway and the United Kingdom have exchanged diplomats since Norway became independent in 1905, when the polar explorer Fridtjof Nansen was appointed Minister. The Norwegian legation was upgraded to a full embassy during the Second World War when the Norwegian government sat in exile in London. The current Embassy is located in Belgravia in London.

List of heads of mission

Envoys Extraordinary and Ministers Plenipotentiary to the United Kingdom
1906–1908: Fridtjof Nansen
1908–1910: Johannes Irgens
1910–1934: Benjamin Vogt
1934–1942: Erik Colban

Ambassadors to the United Kingdom
1942–1946: Erik Colban
1946–1959: Per Preben Prebensen
1959–1961: Erik Braadland
1962–1968: Arne Skaug
1968–1975: Paul Koht
1975–1982: Frithjof Jacobsen
1982–1989: Rolf Trygve Busch
1989–1994: Kjell Eliassen
1994–1996: Tom Vraalsen
1996–2000: Kjell Colding
2000–2005: Tarald Brautaset
2005–2010: Bjarne Lindstrøm
2010–2014: Kim Traavik
2014–2019: Mona Juul
2019–present: Wegger Christian Strømmen

References

External links
Norwegian Embassy in London

Ambassadors of Norway to the United Kingdom
United Kingdom
Norway